Rophites is a genus of insects belonging to the family Halictidae.

The species of this genus are found in Eurasia.

Species:
 Rophites algirus Pérez, 1895 
 Rophites anatolicus (Schwammberger, 1975)

References

Halictidae
Hymenoptera genera